Re Vandervell Trustees Ltd (No 2) [1974] EWCA Civ 7 is a leading English trusts law case, concerning resulting trusts.

This was the third decision concerning Tony Vandervell's will. The first was Vandervell v Inland Revenue Commissioners, where the House of Lords was concerned with whether an oral instruction to transfer an equitable interest in shares complied with the writing requirement under Law of Property Act 1925 section 53(1)(c), and so whether receipt of dividends was subject to tax. The second was In re Vandervell's Trusts, which involved the Special Commissioner of the Inland Revenue's ability to amend tax assessments.

Facts
Tony Vandervell, a wealthy racing car manufacturer, was attempting to make a donation to the Royal College of Surgeons to establish a chair in his name. Since large donations were taxed at the time, he granted the College a number of shares in his company, and paid dividends on those shares, which the College (being a charity), would receive tax-free. However, this scheme was defeated in the case Vandervell v Inland Revenue Commissioners.

Vandervell therefore had the shares repurchased by a trust company set up to manage his children's inheritance, through an option that had been granted during the setup of the original tax-avoidance scheme. As such, the trust company considered themselves as holding the purchased shares on trust for the children, and Vandervell proceeded to pay dividends on the shares with the intention of benefiting his children. However, the tax authority continued to view the shares as being Vandervell's personal property, and charged him taxes on the dividends paid. So Vandervell signed a document explicitly transferring any remaining rights in the shares to the trust company.

Two years later Vandervell died, but the tax authority continued to seek payment of taxes on all dividends paid before he signed the document. Furthermore, on the same basis, Vandervell's own executors made a claim to recover the dividends themselves from the trust company.

Judgment

High Court
Megarry J gave judgment, holding that there was liability to pay tax. He distinguished two kinds of resulting trusts as "presumed resulting trusts", where the courts presume the parties' intend to make a resulting trust, and "automatic resulting trusts", where assets are passed to a trustee on express trusts, but a surplus remains. In each case the assets return (or result back) to the transferor.

Court of Appeal
The Court of Appeal (overturning the judgment of Megarry J in the High Court) held that the option ceased to exist once it was exercised. Thus, there was no disposition, and no consequent liability to pay tax. It also held that the children were the equitable owners of the shares, and, as such, Vandervell had divested himself of equitable ownership of the shares.

Lord Denning MR gave his judgment as follows.

Stephenson LJ, with some reservation, concurred. Lawton LJ gave a concurring judgment.

See also

English trusts law
Resulting trusts in English law
Vandervell v IRC [1967] 2 AC 291
Tinsley v Milligan [1994] 1 AC 340 
Tribe v Tribe [1996] Ch 107
Westdeutsche Landesbank Girozentrale v Islington London Borough Council [1996] AC 669
Air Jamaica Ltd v Charlton [1999] 1 WLR 1399
Barclays Bank Ltd v Quistclose Investments Ltd [1970] AC 567 
Twinsectra Ltd v Yardley [2002] 2 AC 164

Notes

References

English trusts case law
Lord Denning cases
Court of Appeal (England and Wales) cases
1974 in British law
1974 in case law